The 2021–22 Maritime Junior Hockey League season is the 54th season in the league's history. Teams were scheduled to play 52 games each, but due to the COVID-19 pandemic teams played a reduced scheduled.

Regular-season standings 

Note: GP = Games played; W = Wins; L = Losses; OTL = Overtime losses; SL = Shootout losses; PTS = Points; PCT. = Points percentage; x = Clinched playoff spot y = Clinched division; z = Clinched first overall

Standings decided by points percentage.

Final standing

2022 MHL Playoff bracket

2022 MHL playoffs
 *=If Necessary

South Division Semi-final (1) Yarmouth Mariners vs. (4) Valley Wildcats

South Division Semi-final (2) Amherst Ramblers vs. (3) Truro Bearcats

North Division Semi-final (1) Summerside Western Capitals vs. (4) Edmundston Blizzard

North Division Semi-final (2) Campbellton Tigers vs. (3) Fredericton Red Wings

South Division Final (3) Truro Bearcats vs. (4) Valley Wildcats

North Division Final (1) Summerside Western Capitals vs. (3) Fredericton Red Wings

Canadian Tire Cup final (N1) Summerside Western Capitals vs. (S3) Truro Bearcats

References

 Official website of the Maritime Junior Hockey League
 Official website of the Canadian Junior Hockey League

MHL
Maritime Junior Hockey League seasons